The Hater of Men is a 1917 silent film drama directed by Charles Miller and starring Bessie Barriscale. It was produced by Kay-Bee Pictures and by Triangle Distributing.

A print is said to survive in a US archive or private collection.

Cast
Bessie Barriscale - Janice Salsbury
Charles K. French - Phillips Hartley
John Gilbert - Billy Williams (*as Jack Gilbert)

References

External links
The Hater of Men at IMDb.com

 archived still

1917 films
American silent feature films
Triangle Film Corporation films
American black-and-white films
Silent American drama films
1917 drama films
Films directed by Charles Miller
1910s American films
1910s English-language films